Lingleville is an unincorporated community and is located in Erath County, Texas, United States.  Lingleville is located at the intersection of Farm Road 8 and Farm Road 219 ten miles west of Stephenville in west central Erath County.

History
In 1884 R. P. Campbell opened a grocery store in his house in the hollow below what is now the townsite. Before a post office was established there, the community was called Needmore. It was renamed to honor John Lingle, who had settled there in 1874. In 1940 the town had the post office, four businesses, and 200 residents. In 1980 through 2000 its population was reported as 100.

Education
The Lingleville Independent School District serves area students and home to the Lingleville High School Cardinals.

Notable person
Ulane Bonnel, née Ulane Zeeck, naval historian

Climate
The climate in this area is characterized by relatively high temperatures and evenly distributed precipitation throughout the year.  The Köppen Climate System describes the weather as humid subtropical, and uses the abbreviation Cfa.

References

External links
 

Unincorporated communities in Texas
Unincorporated communities in Erath County, Texas